April 7 - Eastern Orthodox liturgical calendar - April 9

All fixed commemorations below are observed on April 21 by Eastern Orthodox Churches on the Old Calendar.

For April 8th, Orthodox Churches on the Old Calendar commemorate the Saints listed on March 26.

Saints

 Holy Apostles of the Seventy:
 Herodion, Agabus, Asyncritus of Hyrcania, Rufus, Phlegon, Hermes, and those who suffered with them (1st century)
 Martyr Pausilipus of Heraclea in Thrace (ca. 117-138)
 Monk-martyrs Josiah and Joseph, of Mt. Kharasam, Persia (c. 341)
 Saint Celestine, Pope of Rome (432)  (see also: April 6 - West)

Pre-Schism Western saints

 Martys Januarius, Maxima and Macaria, in North Africa.
 Martyr Concessa, a martyr venerated from early times in Carthage in North Africa.
 Saint Amantius of Como, successor of St Provinus as Bishop of Como in Italy (440)
 Saint Perpetuus, Bishop of Tours in France (490)
 Saint Redemptus, Bishop of Ferentini in Italy (586)

Post-Schism Orthodox saints

 Saint Philaret of Seminara (Filarete of Calabria), Calabria (ca. 1070)
 Saint Niphont, Bishop of Novgorod (1156)
 Venerable Rufus the Recluse (Rufus the Obedient), of the Kiev Caves (14th century)  (see also: April 6)
 New Martyr John (Koulikas) (1564) 
 New Martyr John Naukliros ("the Navigator"), burned alive on Kos (1669)

New martyrs and confessors

 New Hieromartyr Sergius Rodakovsky, Archpriest, of Tal, Belorussia (1933)

Other commemorations

 Spanish Icon of the Most Holy Theotokos (792)
 Repose of Righteous Helen Voronova (1916), disciple of Elder Barsanuphius of Optina Monastery.

Icon gallery

Notes

References

Sources
 April 8 / April 21. Orthodox Calendar (pravoslavie.ru).
 April 21 / April 8. Holy Trinity Russian Orthodox Church (A parish of the Patriarchate of Moscow).
 April 8. OCA - The Lives of the Saints.
 The Autonomous Orthodox Metropolia of Western Europe and the Americas. St. Hilarion Calendar of Saints for the year of our Lord 2004. St. Hilarion Press (Austin, TX). p. 27.
 April 8. Latin Saints of the Orthodox Patriarchate of Rome.
 The Roman Martyrology. Transl. by the Archbishop of Baltimore. Last Edition, According to the Copy Printed at Rome in 1914. Revised Edition, with the Imprimatur of His Eminence Cardinal Gibbons. Baltimore: John Murphy Company, 1916. p. 99.
 Rev. Richard Stanton. A Menology of England and Wales, or, Brief Memorials of the Ancient British and English Saints Arranged According to the Calendar, Together with the Martyrs of the 16th and 17th Centuries. London: Burns & Oates, 1892. p. 149.
Greek Sources
 Great Synaxaristes:  8 Απριλίου. Μεγασ Συναξαριστησ.
  Συναξαριστής. 8 Απριλίου. Eeclesia.gr. (H Εκκλησια Τησ Ελλαδοσ). 
Russian Sources
  21 апреля (8 апреля). Православная Энциклопедия под редакцией Патриарха Московского и всея Руси Кирилла (электронная версия). (Orthodox Encyclopedia - Pravenc.ru).
  8 апреля (ст.ст.) 21 апреля 2013 (нов. ст.) . Русская Православная Церковь Отдел внешних церковных связей.

April in the Eastern Orthodox calendar